Table tennis competitions at the 2019 Pan American Games in Lima, Peru are scheduled to be held between August 4 and 10, 2019 at the Polideportivo 3 located at the Villa Deportiva Nacional Videna.

Seven medal events are scheduled to be contested, two singles events, three doubles events and two team events. All the doubles are additions to the sports program from four years ago in Toronto.

Medal table

Medalists

Participating nations
A total of 18 countries qualified athletes. The number of athletes a nation entered is in parentheses beside the name of the country.

Qualification

A total of 84 athletes will qualify to compete (42 men and 42 women). Each nation may enter a maximum of 6 athletes (three per gender). In each gender there will be a total of 12 teams qualified, with one team per event reserved for the host nation Peru. Six places will be allocated for singles events (by gender) to athletes that have obtained the best results at the qualification tournament for singles events of the Pan American Games.

See also
Table tennis at the 2019 Parapan American Games
Table tennis at the 2020 Summer Olympics

References

External links
Results book

 
Events at the 2019 Pan American Games
2019
Pan American Games
Table tennis in Peru